Sthenictis is an extinct genus in the weasel family (mustelids) endemic to North America and Asia during the Miocene epoch living from ~15.97—5.33 Ma (AEO) existing for approximately .

Fossil distribution
The oldest specimen was uncovered at Black Butte, Malheur County, Oregon. Other locations are: Quatal Canyon, Ventura County, California, Kleinfelder Farm, Saskatchewan, Canada, Nebraska, Texas, Florida and in Inner Mongolia, in China.

References

Miocene mammals of North America
Miocene mammals of Asia
Miocene mustelids
Fossil taxa described in 1910
Prehistoric carnivoran genera